Final Goodbye may refer to:

 "Final Goodbye", a 1994 song by Usher from Usher
 "Final Goodbye", a 2006 song by Rihanna from A Girl like Me